Peteravenia is a genus of Mesoamerican plants in the tribe Eupatorieae within the family Asteraceae.

The genus is named for US botanist Peter H. Raven.

 Species
 Peteravenia cyrilli-nelsonii (Ant.Molina) R.M.King & H.Rob. - Honduras
 Peteravenia grisea (J.M.Coult.) R.M.King & H.Rob. - Honduras, Guatemala, Nicaragua  description Nash, Flora of Guatemala
 Peteravenia malvifolia (DC.) R.M.King & H.Rob. - Nuevo León, San Luis Potosí
 Peteravenia phoenicolepis (B.L.Rob.) R.M.King & H.Rob. - Guatemala, El Salvador, Honduras, Mexico (Chiapas)
 Peteravenia schultzii (Schnittsp.) R.M.King & H.Rob. - Honduras, Mexico (Chiapas, Oaxaca, Tamaulipas, Veracruz, Querétaro), Guatemala, Nicaragua,  El Salvador, Costa Rica,

References

Eupatorieae
Asteraceae genera
Flora of Central America
Flora of Mexico